Mittagong Station is a pastoral lease that operates as a cattle station in Queensland. 

Charles Lind sold the property in 2006 stocked with 17,500 head of cattle for 17.5 million.

See also
List of ranches and stations

References

 
Pastoral leases in Queensland 
Stations (Australian agriculture)